Malepunyo Range (also known as Malipunyo Range or Mount Malarayat) is an extinct volcano located on Luzon Island in the Philippines. The mountain range is located between the provinces of Batangas, Laguna and Quezon. It is popular among mountaineers, and has three interconnected destinations: Mt. Malepunyo, the highest; Bagwis Peak (also known as Mt. Susong-Cambing); and Mount Dalaga (also known as Manabu Peak).

History

The Malepunyo Range is an inactive volcano with its caldera  facing south along the vicinity between Lipa City and San Antonio, Quezon. By the 1990s the Malepunyo Mountain Range has been erroneously tagged as Malarayat Mountain Range due to the famous country club located at its western slope named after the Malarayat Hill. During the 1990s, the name was changed by the locals of Santo Tomas to Manabu as a shortened Tagalog phrase Mataas na Bundok which means "High Mountain". At the center of the mountain range is a cliff known as Bagwis Cliff by the locals, yet due to its shape that resembles a goat's breast, it is also called as Susong-Kambing (English: Goat's Breast). In time, mountaineers have also mistakenly named this cliff as Susong Dalaga (English: maiden's breast) which is actually the oldest name of Manabu Peak. A discontinued highway project connecting San Pablo City and Lipa City that traverses the central part of the mountain range made way for the creation of what the mountaineers call as Biak na Bundok (en. Sliced Mountain).

Physical Characteristics

The Malepunyo mountain range has four notable peaks:

Geology 
Mount Malepunyo is part of Makiling-Malepunyo Volcanic Complex. Mount Makiling, located on the southwest rim of Laguna de Bay, is a 16-kilometer-diameter stratovolcano that reaches 1115 meters above sea level. The cone is formed by a pyroclastic flow, lahar, airfall, and lava deposits. Trachyandesites, trachydacites, and rhyolite are found in the lavas. Welded ash-flow tuffs attest to the eruption's Plinian origin. The La Mesa tuff ring, Bijiang, Mapinggon, and Masaia are all examples of smaller satellitic edifices. To the south of Mt. Makiling lies a severely eroded north-south trending volcanic range, including Mapinggon, Bulalo, and Malepunyo. The higher portions of this composite volcano are dominated by lava flows and breccias, while pyroclastic flows and lahars dominate the eastern flanks. The age of the andesites from Mount Malepunyo ranges from 1.10 Ma to 0.63 Ma (De Boer and others, 1980; Oles and others, 1991).

Product
The mountain range is a famous source of Alamid Coffee due to civet cats that chew on coffee beans and ferments the seeds inside its digestive system. The fermented coffee beans are then excreted along the trails and is cleaned and pulverized for coffee preparation.

Hiking
The jurisdiction of the Malepunyo Range is separated into two. The Manabu peak is under the jurisdiction of Santo Tomas, Batangas to which its jump-off is at Sitio Sulok. It resembles an easy trail to which a cross has been erected on its summit while a plateau beside it is used as a saddle camp. The southern half is under the jurisdiction of Lipa City, Batangas and the jump-off is located at Sitio Talisay. To which the trail leads to the summit of Mount Malepunyo. A class-4 trail connects Malipunyo to Manabu peak which passes through the vicinity of Bagwis Peak and the grassland plateau leading to Biak-na-Bundok and by the dense forest of the mountain range towards the plateau campsite of Manabu.

See also
List of inactive volcanoes in the Philippines

References

External links
Mt. Malepunyo (Mt. Malarayat) on Pinoy Mountaineer

Malepunyo
Malepunyo
Malepunyo
Landforms of Batangas
Landforms of Laguna (province)
Landforms of Quezon
Pleistocene stratovolcanoes
Stratovolcanoes of the Philippines